Pagala Karichu Tu is a 2014 Odia film under the Sarthak Films Banner, produced by Sitaram Agrawal starring Riya dey and Siddhanta Mahapatra.

Cast
 Amlan Das as Shiba
 Riya Dey as Shardha
 Siddhanta Mahapatra as Bagha
 Mihir Das as KAKA
 Satyaki Mishra
 Bijay Mohanty
 Harihara Mahapatra as Shiba's friend
 Ankita Bhowmick (in item song)
 Papu Sahoo (in Dj song)

Music
All Songs for this movie has been composed by Bikash Das

 Music Director - Bikash Das
 Vocals - Vinod Rathore, Babul Supriyo, Kumar Sanu, Udit Narayan, Namita Agarwal

Track listing

References

External links
 

2014 films
2010s Odia-language films
Films directed by Susant Mani